Events in the year 1902 in Brazil.

Incumbents

Federal government
President: Manuel Ferraz de Campos Sales (to 14 November); Francisco de Paula Rodrigues Alves (from 15 November)
Vice President: Francisco de Assis Rosa e Silva (to 14 November); Afonso Pena (from 15 November)

Governors 
 Alagoas: Euclides Vieira Malta
 Amazonas: Silvério José Néri
 Bahia: Severino Vieira
 Ceará: Antônio Nogueira Accioli
 Goiás: José Xavier de Almeida
 Maranhão:
 until 1 March: João Gualberto Torreão da Costa
 from 1 March: Manuel Lopes da Cunha
 Mato Grosso: Antônio Pedro Alves de Barros
 Minas Gerais: 
 until 21 February: Silviano Brandão
 21 February - 7 September: Joaquim Cândido da Costa Sena
 from 7 September: Francisco Salles
 Pará: Augusto Montenegro
 Paraíba: José Peregrino de Araújo
 Paraná: Francisco Xavier da Silva
 Pernambuco: Antônio Gonçalves Ferreira
 Piauí: Arlindo Francisco Nogueira
 Rio Grande do Norte: Alberto Maranhão
 Rio Grande do Sul: Antônio Augusto Borges de Medeiros
 Santa Catarina: Felipe Schmidt (until 28 September); Lauro Müller
 São Paulo: 
 Sergipe:

Vice governors 
 Rio Grande do Norte:
 São Paulo:

Events
1 March - Presidential election: Rodrigues Alves of the Republican Party of São Paulo receives 91.7% of the vote.  Francisco Silviano de Almeida Brandão is elected vice-president but dies suddenly before the start of his term of office.
26 October - The first season of competitive football in Brazil concludes with a victory for São Paulo Athletic Club.
3 December - José Paranhos, Baron of Rio Branco, is appointed Minister of Foreign Affairs.  His ten-year tenure would be the longest in the country's history.

Literature
Euclides da Cunha - Os Sertões

Births
22 April - Elsie Houston, singer (died 1943)
12 September - Juscelino Kubitschek, politician (died 1976)
31 October - Carlos Drummond de Andrade, poet (died 1987)
18 December - Moacyr Siqueira de Queiroz ("Russinho"), footballer (died 1992)

Deaths
15 March - Custódio José de Melo, monarchist admiral and politician, foreign minister 1892
12 May - Augusto Severo de Albuquerque Maranhão, politician and journalist
6 July - Leopoldo Miguez, composer (born 1850)
3 September - Eduardo Wandenkolk, naval officer and politician
25 September - Silviano Brandão, Vice-President elect
9 November - Manuel Vitorino Pereira, 2nd vice-president of Brazil
3 December - Prudente de Morais, politician, President of Brazil 1894-1898 (born 1841)

References

See also
1902 in Brazilian football

 
1900s in Brazil
Years of the 20th century in Brazil
Brazil
Brazil